The 2022 season was Hammarby Fotboll's 107th in existence, their 53rd season in Allsvenskan and their 8th consecutive season in the league. They competed in Allsvenskan and Svenska Cupen, as defending champions. League play started in April. Martí Cifuentes made his first season as head coach.

Summary
On 13 December 2021, shortly after the final league fixture the previous campaign, head coach Miloš Milojević was sacked by Hammarby IF, after he had sought a move to Norwegian side Rosenborg BK and visited Trondheim without Hammarby's permission, in a deal that ultimately fell through. The club's board called his behavior "unacceptable" and stated that they had "lost all their trust" in Milojević.

On 7 January 2022, Hammarby sold midfielder Aziz Ouattara Mohammed to Belgian First Division A club Genk. The terms were undisclosed, but the club confirmed they had received the second biggest transfer fee in its history, reportedly set at around 30 million SEK. On 31 January 2022, Hammarby sold winger Akinkunmi Amoo for reportedly 46 million SEK to F.C. Copenhagen, at the time a record transfer fee for the club.

In early January 2022, Martí Cifuentes was appointed as new head coach, signed from Danish club AaB on a three-year contract. In late May, Hammarby reached the final of the 2021–22 Svenska Cupen, but lost 4–5 on penalties to Malmö FF after the game ended in a 0–0 draw.

During the summer transfer window, Hammarby sold Williot Swedberg to Celta de Vigo for a reported fee of 56 million SEK bonuses and a sell-on clause, making it a new record breaking transfer for Hammarby. At the same time, Hammarby paid a new record breaking fee in July, signing Veton Berisha from Viking FK for a reported sum of around 20 million NOK.

In Allsvenskan, Hammarby finished 3rd in the table, thus qualifying for the 2023–24 UEFA Europa Conference League. Midfielder Nahir Besara played all 30 fixtures, scoring 11 goals and providing 11 assists, the most in the whole league. At the end of the season, he was nominated for Allsvenskan Midfielder of the Year, an award that eventually went to Mikkel Rygaard, but was voted Hammarby Player of the Year by the supporters of the club.

Players

Squad information

Transfers

In

Out

Player statistics

Appearances and goals

|-
! colspan=12 style=background:#DCDCDC; text-align:center| Goalkeepers

|-
! colspan=12 style=background:#DCDCDC; text-align:center| Defenders

|-
! colspan=12 style=background:#DCDCDC; text-align:center| Midfielders

|-
! colspan=12 style=background:#DCDCDC; text-align:center| Forwards

|-
! colspan="18" style="background:#dcdcdc; text-align:center"| Players transferred/loaned out during the season

|-

Club

Coaching staff

Technical staff

Other information

Pre-season and friendlies

Friendlies

Competitions

Allsvenskan

League table

Results summary

Results by round

Matches
Kickoff times are in (UTC+01) unless stated otherwise.

Svenska Cupen

2021–22
The tournament continued from the 2021 season.

Kickoff times are in UTC+1.

Group 3

Knockout stage

2022–23
The tournament continues into the 2023 season.

Qualification stage

Footnotes

References

Hammarby Fotboll seasons
Hammarby Fotboll